Joel Broda (born November 24, 1989) is a Canadian professional ice hockey centre. He is currently an unrestricted free agent. He was selected by the Washington Capitals in the 5th round, 144th overall, in the 2008 NHL Entry Draft.

Playing career
On May 7, 2010, Broda won the Ed Chynoweth Cup with the Calgary Hitmen. He scored his sole final series goal in the game 2, against his former WHL team, the Tri-City Americans.

On July 13, 2010, Broda was signed as an unrestricted free agent by the Minnesota Wild to a three-year entry-level contract, and on September 23, 2010 he was assigned to their top farm team, the Houston Aeros of the American Hockey League.

On January 19, 2011 Broda was assigned to the Wilds ECHL affiliate, the Bakersfield Condors.

On August 15, 2013, Broda returned to the Condors as a free agent, signing a one-year contract to Captain the club for the 2013–14 season. On October 15, 2013, Broda was signed to a PTO Contract with the Oklahoma City Barons of the AHL On February 19, 2014, Broda was signed to a PTO with the Bridgeport Sound Tigers of AHL. On April 1, Broda was released from PTO to return to the Bakersfield Condors  to play the ECHL playoffs as team captain.

As a free agent, Broda made a return of sorts to Capitals organization, in signing a one-year AHL contract with affiliate, the Hershey Bears on August 19, 2014.

On August 29, 2015, Broda left North America as free agent in signing his first contract abroad with Italian club, HCB South Tyrol of the Austrian EBEL. He excelled as his team's leading scorer (26 goals, 22 assists in 60 games) in his first season in Europe and then penned a deal with fellow EBEL outfit EHC Linz in April 2016.

On August 14, 2020, Broda continued his career in Austria, joining his fifth club in 6 seasons by signing a one-year contract with the Graz99ers.

Career statistics

Awards and honours

References

External links

1989 births
Bakersfield Condors (1998–2015) players
Bolzano HC players
Bridgeport Sound Tigers players
Calgary Hitmen players
Canadian ice hockey centres
Canadian expatriate ice hockey players in Austria
Canadian expatriate ice hockey players in Italy
Dornbirn Bulldogs players
EHC Black Wings Linz players
Graz 99ers players
Hershey Bears players
Houston Aeros (1994–2013) players
Ice hockey people from Saskatchewan
Kassel Huskies players
Living people
Moose Jaw Warriors players
Oklahoma City Barons players
Orlando Solar Bears (ECHL) players
Sportspeople from Yorkton
Tri-City Americans players
HC TWK Innsbruck players
EC VSV players
Washington Capitals draft picks